Mycobacterium monacense is a yellow-pigmented, non-photochromogenic species of mycobacterium named after Monacum, the Latin name of the German city Munich where the first strain was isolated. It grows in less than a week on solid medium.

Phylogenetic analysis has shown that this strain is most closely related to Mycobacterium doricum.

Description
It is thought to be responsible for a severe, post-traumatic wound infection, reported in a healthy boy.

Pathogenesis

Type strain
First isolated in Munich, Germany
Strain B9-21-178 = CIP 109237 = DSM 44395.

References

External links
Type strain of Mycobacterium monacense at BacDive -  the Bacterial Diversity Metadatabase

Acid-fast bacilli
monacense
Bacteria described in 2006